Yan Ruyi (严如熤) (1759–1826) was an independent gentry scholar of considerable local influence in Western Hunan, Southern China during Qing dynasty. A child prodigy, he studied at the Yuelu Academy in Changsha. In 1795, Yan Ruyi was involved in a debacle in which he organized a group of Gelao to defend against the raging Miao Rebellion (1795–1797). A Qing government force mistook the Gelao for enemies and crushed the independent force. Yan Ruyi returned to his hometown in disgrace.

He later became famous for his contributions to frontier studies including Miaofang Beilan, Yangfang Jiyao, and Sansheng Bianfang.  His model of making connections between government forces and certain friendly native peoples was used to great effect later during the White Lotus Rebellion and the Taiping Rebellion.

Sources
McMahon, Daniel.  "Identity and Conflict on a Chinese Borderland: Yan Ruyi and the Recruitment of the Gelao During the 1795-97 Miao Revolt." Late Imperial China Vol. 23, No. 2 (December 2002):53-86.

Qing dynasty politicians from Hunan
Qing dynasty military personnel
1759 births
1826 deaths
Politicians from Huaihua
Political office-holders in Shaanxi
Political office-holders in Guizhou
Chinese geographers
Qing dynasty historians
Historians from Hunan
19th-century Chinese historians